The 1991–92 Lithuanian Hockey League season was the first season of the Lithuanian Hockey League. SC Energija won the inaugural championship.

External links
 Lithuanian Ice Hockey Federation

Lithuanian Hockey League
Lithuania Hockey League seasons
Lith